The , or belt race, is a traditional sport often played during the patronal festival in Spain and Latin America. Contestants, who may be on either horses or bicycles, ride towards the wire and attempt to capture a belt by putting a peg through the loop. Traditionally, the belts are given to a group of women who then award prizes. Its origins can be traced back to medieval tournaments on horseback.

References

External links
 The carrera de cintas at Worldwide Ministries
 El Diario de Occidente on the carrera de cintas (Spanish language)

Mounted games